Alex Anisi (died 18 February 2012) was a Papua New Guinean politician. He was Premier of East Sepik Province from June 1993 to August 1995, and subsequently served as secretary-general of the People's Progress Party for two parliamentary terms until 2011. He was a candidate for the National Parliament at the 2012 election when he died suddenly during the campaign. His son, Ezekiel Anisi, subsequently entered politics himself.

References

Year of birth missing
2012 deaths
Papua New Guinean politicians
People's Progress Party politicians